Crucible of Terror is a 1971 British horror film  and directed by Ted Hooker and starring Mike Raven, Mary Maude and James Bolam. Its plot centres on a reclusive artist in Cornwall. Besides painting young women, he has encased the living body of one in plaster and poured into it, through an eyehole, molten bronze, which killed her, made a cast of her body and turned it into a beautiful sculpture. After the bronze sells at a good price, he finds a 'suitable' second woman and attempts to do the same. But before he can, he meets a grisly demise at the hands of the first woman, a member of a 'weird sect', whose spirit has possessed the body of the second woman.

Synopsis
Struggling art dealer John Davies (Bolam) is putting on an exhibit of works by the reclusive artist Victor Clare (Raven), whose art hasn't been shown since World War II. Unusually, the artworks have been stolen by Victor's son Michael (Ronald Lacey), an alcoholic in need of money.

Joanna and George Brent (Melissa Stribling and Kenneth Keeling) come to the show and George is immediately enamoured of a bronze of a reclining nude woman. Although it has already been sold, George demands that John sell it to him instead. After they leave, John tells Michael that Michael's share of the proceeds will come to £500, which pleases Michael, but John says that his share will go towards the loan from Joanna that financed the show.

John and Michael decide to approach Victor about selling more of his artwork. They and their wives - respectively Millie (Maude) and Jane (Beth Morris) - travel to Cornwall, where Victor's house and studio sit atop an abandoned tin mine. The husbands and wives drive separately as Jane and Michael have quarrelled.

George breaks into the closed gallery. While caressing the bronze nude, someone sneaks up behind him and smothers him with a sheet of clear plastic.

John and Michael arrive first in Cornwall. They meet Marcia (Judy Matheson), Victor's usual model, and Dorothy (Betty Alberge), Victor's wife. Dorothy dresses and acts like a child; Victor calls her a 'senile old hag'. While out walking, Michael tells John that a 'weird sect', led by a woman (Me Me Lai) who suddenly vanished, used to be based there. When Millie and Jane arrive, they all meet Bill Cartwright (John Arnatt), Victor's only friend for the past 30 years. Victor immediately begins to pressure Millie to pose for him, but he frightens her.

Victor tells Millie that he has made only one sculpture and offers her an Oriental bronze bowl as a gift. Millie throws it to the floor in fear. That night, Millie awakens screaming from a nightmare of a woman in a scary Asian mask. The woman holds a sword, the bowl Victor offered and wears a kimono identical to the one Millie owns.

Michael and Jane argue again. Jane angrily says that she's going back to London but instead poses for Victor. When she refuses Victor's advances he stomps out of the studio in a rage. Then, as Jane dresses, someone stabs her to death, throws her body out a window, stuffs her remains into her car and drives off.

John looks over Victor's artwork and offers him £2000. Victor accepts but demands 'hard cash'. When John says that it's Sunday and the banks are closed - a dodge because he doesn't have £2000 - Victor gives him a deadline of that night to make good. John leaves for London to try to raise the money.

Marcia and Millie go to the beach. When Marcia notices Michael ogling them, she pelts him with stones. As he retreats into the sea, he falls over, but before he can get up, someone bludgeons him with a large rock and his body floats away.

Bill shows Millie his collection of Asian swords, helmets and shields. The sword is the one Millie saw in her nightmare. Meanwhile, in London, John can't raise the cash. Even Joanna refuses him another loan.

Millie goes walking alone but spots Victor nearby. She flees into the mine. Victor follows. She unexpectedly bumps into Dorothy, who leads her from the mine and directly into the house via a passageway before Victor can find her.

Millie goes to Victor's forge. Bill has fired it up because Victor says that he wants to capture Millie's beauty in bronze. She refuses and returns to her room. She finds Dorothy there. Dorothy has a present for Millie - the mask worn by the woman in Millie's nightmare.

Victor asks Bill if Millie reminds him of 'our Japanese friend'. Bill wonders aloud what happened to the woman but Victor only says that she was 'a little bitch' who 'actually thought she was immortal'. Victor gives Bill an old painting of Dorothy, who used to be his model. Accepting it, Bill asks why Victor has stayed married to Dorothy for so long. Victor coldly says that he needs her money, cruelly adding that Dorothy never wanted Bill, 'not then, not even now'.

John phones Millie, who pleads with him to come back immediately. But John's car has broken down and she has to wait while Bill fetches him. Dorothy asks Bill if he really had wanted to marry her. When he says that they'll discuss it later, Dorothy picks up a straight razor and heads for her private 'cave' in the mine.

Victor finally convinces Millie to pose, hypnotising her in the flickering light of the burning forge. Back at the studio, he abruptly sacks Marcia. She obliquely tries to warn Millie about Victor, then goes to her room. Someone knocks and when Marcia opens the door, the person throws acid in her face, disfiguring and killing her.

Victor makes a clumsy pass at Millie in his studio, kissing her thigh while rearranging her kimono. She runs to the passageway with Victor in pursuit. In the mine, she finds Michael's body floating in water and Dorothy dead, her wrists slashed with the straight razor.

John and Bill return and, not finding Millie or Victor in the house, head for the forge. There, Victor is already preparing to pour molten bronze onto Millie to create the sculpture. Suddenly, a disfigured woman rises from the table upon which Millie was lying. She and Victor struggle and the woman forces him onto the hot coals of the forge. John rushes in just in time to yell 'Millie! No!' as Marcia's laughing face appears in the flames of Victor's burning head.

After medical personnel remove a covered body, John says that he doesn't understand what's happened. Bill says that everything was caused by 'Chi-San', the Japanese cultist whom Victor turned into his only bronze. He explains that the cultists believe that anyone who wears the kimono will be possessed and 'take revenge'. Bill says that Millie didn't realise what she was doing as she was 'completely under Chi-San's control' while committing the murders.

John calls Millie's purchase of the kimono a horrible coincidence. Bill says it was no coincidence, rather 'it was pre-ordained'. The kimono lies on the floor. Only John and Bill are left.

Cast
 Mike Raven as Victor Clare
 Mary Maude as Millie Davies
 James Bolam as John Davies
 Ronald Lacey as Michael Clare
Melissa Stribling as Joanna Brent
 John Arnatt as Bill Cartwright
Betty Alberge as Dorothy Clare
Judy Matheson as Marcia
 Beth Morris as Jane Clare
 Kenneth Keeling as George Brent
 Me Me Lai as Chi-San

Production 
It was produced by Tom Parkinson for the independent Glendale Film Productions
Exteriors for Crucible of Terror were shot around St Agnes on the Cornish coast and Hammersmith in London with interiors filmed at Shepperton Studios. The budget was 'allegedly £100,000' part of which was put up by the film's star, Michael Raven, 'a British disc jockey turned actor'. Nonetheless, the film was 'not financially successful'. Crucible of Terror was the first film directed by Ted Hooker.

Distribution 
Crucible of Terror played in theatres in the UK on a double-bill with Lady Frankenstein, both of which carried X-certificates. The X cert prohibited the exhibition of the film to people under age 18.

Although film historian John Hamilton writes that because 'the American market was already flooded with low-budget British films, Crucible of Terror was not deemed worthy of a US release and its failure was assured', film critic Gary A. Smith notes a US running time of 79 minutes, compared to the 91 minutes of the UK version, implying that there was an American release, which he places in 1972. As well, an American film poster shows that the film carried a theatrical M rating, which meant it was intended for 'mature' audiences, although no minimum age was specified as being 'mature'. There is no date on the poster, however, nor does it note whether Crucible of Terror was on a double-bill. (Note: the 'M' rating in the US was in use from 1968 to 1970, when it was replaced with the 'GP' rating. The poster in question is probably of Australian origin).

The film was distributed theatrically in the UK in 1972 by Scotia-Barber and at unspecified dates in Australia by Filmways Australasian Distributors. It was also shown in theatres in what was then West Germany, as well as in Japan, Spain, Italy and Turkey. It has been released on VHS and DVD at least 12 times between 1985 and 2016. The film was retitled Unholy Terror for its initial release on VHS in the US.

Reception 
Reviews of Crucible of Terror are largely negative, albeit with the occasional positive comment.

Film critic Kim Newman describes the film as being 'part of the marginal cinema, where double-bill-fillers can be sold for either sex or violence' and 'where nothing else matters', noting that 'the girls are mostly pretty and disposable'. However, Newman goes on to write that 'these films, intentionally or not, manage to locate their horrors in a recognisable, seedy British setting, otherwise unexplored in the movies'.

Smith calls Crucible of Terror 'unpleasant and unmemorable' while film historian Phil Hardy takes the opposite position, writing that it is a 'pleasantly eccentric variation on the house-of-wax theme'. Hardy goes on to say that 'For its climax, the picture shifts into a dreamlike atmosphere, with the mad artist mixing multicoloured concoctions in his cave studio suffused with the glow of the menacing furnace'.

Hamilton says that the film's narrative is 'hopelessly muddled' and that 'the script requires the victims to die in isolation, usually after declaring a desire to leave, which allows the survivors to carry on as if nothing was wrong'. He also criticises some of the actors for 'hamming it up outrageously' whilst others 'give the distinct impression [they] would rather be somewhere else'. On the other hand, Hamilton notes that the 'camerawork makes the barren Cornish landscape look suitably chilly and menacing'. Despite that, even if the budget were £100,000 'on screen it looks far less', he writes.

TV Guide magazine has given Crucible of Terror one out of five stars, and while Rotten Tomatoes doesn't offer an actual rating (because of an insufficient number of votes), it states that of the 100 viewers who have written in, 25 percent said they liked it.

References

External links

1971 films
1970s slasher films
1971 horror films
1970s ghost films
British slasher films
Films shot at Shepperton Studios
Films shot in London
Films shot in Cornwall
Films set in London
Films set in Cornwall
Films about artists
Films about spirit possession
1970s English-language films
1970s British films